Fiona Elizabeth Bruce (born 25 April 1964) is a British journalist, newsreader, and television presenter. She joined the BBC as a researcher for Panorama in 1989, and has since become the first female newsreader on the BBC News at Ten, as well as presenting many flagship programmes for the corporation, including BBC News at Six, Crimewatch, Real Story, Antiques Roadshow, and Fake or Fortune? Since 10 January 2019, she has been the presenter of the BBC One television programme Question Time.

Early life and education 
Bruce was born on 25 April 1964 in what was then the State of Singapore, Malaysia, to an English mother and a Scottish father, who had a long career at Unilever, becoming a regional managing director. Before that, the Bruce family had lived for several generations in the fishing village of Hopeman in Moray (also known as Elginshire) in the north-east of Scotland. Bruce has two elder brothers. She was educated at Gayton Primary School in Wirral, the International School of Milan, and then from the age of 14 until 18 attended Haberdashers' Aske's Hatcham College in New Cross, London. During the latter period she modelled for the stories in the teenage girls' magazine Jackie.

Bruce's great-grandfather, Frederick Crouch, died in fighting on the Western Front in World War I.

Bruce read French and Italian at Hertford College, Oxford. During this period, she was briefly a punk, singing in rock bands and, at one point, colouring her hair blue for one week. She attended the University of London Institute in Paris and is a fluent speaker of French and Italian.

Career
After leaving university, Bruce joined a management consulting firm for a year, but found the experience depressingly dull:

After this, she worked at a number of advertising agencies including Boase Massimi Pollitt (where she met her future husband, a company director). She then went on to meet Tim Gardam – at that time the editor of the BBC's Panorama – at a wedding, and in 1989 he gave her a job as a researcher on the programme.

News and current affairs
After becoming an assistant producer on Panorama, she made the change to reporting in 1992 on Breakfast News. She then moved to BBC South East, appearing as an occasional presenter and reporter on Newsroom South East and a weekly current affairs programme, First Sight. From 1994 to 1995, she was a reporter on the BBC2 current affairs programme Public Eye. She then reported for Panorama and Newsnight before moving to presenting Breakfast News and the BBC Six O'Clock News in 1996.

In 1999, as part of a major relaunch of the BBC's news output, Bruce was named secondary presenter of the BBC Six O'Clock News. She presented the programme as a cover for the main presenter Huw Edwards, as well as regularly on Fridays, until a presenter reshuffle in January 2003 to coincide with the retirement of Michael Buerk and the move of Peter Sissons to the BBC News channel.

Both Edwards and Bruce moved to the BBC Ten O'Clock News and continue to present the programme. Bruce was the first female presenter of the bulletin. In 2007, Bruce returned to presenting the BBC News at Six. After an eleven-year tenure, she stepped down in January 2019. 

From 2003 to 2007, Bruce presented and reported in the BBC One current affairs series, Real Story.

After the murder of Jill Dando, Bruce took over the position of co-presenter on Crimewatch alongside Nick Ross, until both were replaced by Kirsty Young towards the end of 2007. In 2001, Bruce became one of the presenters of the BBC general election results programme.

In 2006, following a court case whereby British Airways requested that a Christian employee conceal her cross, because it infringed the airline's dress code, the BBC disclosed it had some concerns over the fact that Bruce often wore a cross necklace, although she was not banned from doing so.

On 10 January 2019 Bruce, as the first full-time female host, succeeded long-time host David Dimbleby on the BBC's debate programme Question Time. Her tenure as host was almost immediately embroiled in controversy, and in May 2020, Bruce stated "QT is without doubt the hardest job I’ve ever done."

In 2023, during an episode of Question Time, journalist Yasmin Alibhai-Brown referred to Stanley Johnson, former British prime minister Boris Johnson's father, breaking his wife's nose, Bruce interrupted to comment that Johnson's friends had said that the incident occurred, but was a "one-off". Following the episode, Labour MP Kate Osborne and chief executive of domestic violence charity Women's Aid, Farah Nazeer, among others, spoke up against the comment, saying that it downplayed domestic violence. The BBC defended Bruce, commenting that, as the host, she had the duty to present an avenue of reply by accused parties and it was not her personal comment. Bruce apologised for her comments after the incident and resigned as an ambassador for the domestic violence charity Refuge, a role she had been in for over 25 years.

Other programmes
In September 1998, Bruce became the presenter for BBC Two's Antiques Show, which was in its fourth series. She presented it for a further two series, showing her interest in presenting antiques programmes nearly a decade before presenting Antiques Roadshow. On 22 June 2007 it was announced that Bruce was to replace the retiring Michael Aspel as presenter of Antiques Roadshow the following spring; this initially caused some controversy. However, average viewership increased during Bruce's first year as presenter.

In 2007, Bruce wrote and presented a BBC documentary about Cherie Blair as Tony Blair left office.

Bruce also occasionally presented special editions of The Money Programme. In one, she profiled the entrepreneur Alan Sugar. She said of the experience: "It was a bit like being in front of a hair dryer at very close quarters. He's not backwards in coming forward in his opinions." During the documentary, Bruce – who has always publicly identified herself as a feminist – challenged Sugar's view that women should openly disclose their childcare commitments to a potential employer. Her point was that if men were not required to declare their ability to meet the demands of their job, it was not right that women should do so.

Victoria: A Royal Love Story (2010) is a BBC documentary, written and presented by Bruce, charting the story of the love affair between Queen Victoria and Prince Albert, and documenting the collection of paintings, sculptures, and jewellery they gave each other.

Since 2011, she has co-hosted the BBC television series Fake or Fortune? alongside Philip Mould, which examines the process of establishing the authenticity of works of art, including the use of modern techniques.

In 2011, Bruce wrote and presented The Queen's Palaces, a three-part BBC documentary telling the story of Queen Elizabeth II's three official residences, Buckingham Palace, Windsor Castle, and Holyrood Palace. In 2012, Bruce wrote and presented a BBC documentary about Leonardo da Vinci.

In 2015 and 2016, she presented the BBC Four quiz programme Hive Minds.

In 2017, it was reported that Bruce was paid between £350,000 and £400,000 as a BBC presenter. In early 2019 she stated that she did not keep track of her salary which for 2018 was reportedly £170,000, an amount that did not include her earnings from Antiques Roadshow.

Parody and humour
Bruce was featured in an episode of Top Gear (series 10, episode 3), sharing a lift with one of its presenters, Jeremy Clarkson, and then having to push him out (as he was stuck in a Peel P50, which has no reverse gear). As she walked away, Clarkson commented, without her knowledge until the programme was aired, "She has got quite a nice bottom... I said that out loud, didn't I?" Bruce returned to Top Gear in the next series (series 11, episode 4), alongside fellow newsreader Kate Silverton, for the Star in a Reasonably-Priced Car feature. As a comeback to the "nice bottom" comment, she slapped Clarkson's and declared that it "needs a bit of work". Since then, she has also occasionally stood in for a holidaying Clarkson in his Sunday Times car review column, which she referred to as the ultimate revenge: "perching my bottom – nice or otherwise – on his patch."

In the BBC Two version of the satirical impressions show Dead Ringers, Bruce is parodied by Jan Ravens, who ruthlessly exaggerates her mannerisms through sexual innuendo. For example, "Hello, my name is Fiona Bruce sitting on the luckiest chair in Britain", and "Hello, I'm Fiona Bruce; don't touch what you can't afford."

She appeared in a tongue-in-cheek BBC HD advert in 2008, featuring a parody of the Antiques Roadshow where she drove a car through a wall, before running towards a falling vase; the car explodes as she jumps to save the vase from crashing.

Bruce has regularly appeared on the BBC's annual Children in Need telethon, performing musical routines alongside fellow BBC newsreaders. Her rendition of "All That Jazz" while performing as Velma Kelly in the 2007 edition led the directors of the revival of Chicago to invite her to the London performance of the 10th-anniversary gala, where she appeared on stage in a parade of Velmas.

Referring to Jeremy Clarkson's adoration of her – he once described her as "agonisingly gorgeous" – she remarked, "In my twenties I was virulently opposed to anyone commenting on my appearance, lest it come at the expense of my ability. But it's not an issue for me now. If Jeremy Clarkson pays me a compliment, then fine, how nice, 'Thanks Jeremy'."

Political causes
Bruce has often been outspoken regarding her commitment to feminism, expressing concern at a 2006 poll that suggested almost three-quarters of women no longer saw feminism as necessary; "The contradictions are still there [in society] which is why I think feminism is still very relevant for me and it's just such a shame that it's become a byword for mustachioed, man-hating women from Lebanon." Despite her firm views on the subject – including a "disappointment" in women who dislike working with other women – she claims to have softened her feminist views from her university days, where she once ran an anti-pornography campaign.

Fathers 4 Justice controversy
Bruce was criticised for showing "blatant bias" when interviewing Matt O'Connor, founder of Fathers 4 Justice, for a BBC programme in 2004. Bruce, who had featured in advertising campaigns for the charity Women's Aid, was accused of having an axe to grind on the issue of domestic violence. Many, including O'Connor, felt she let her own personal view on domestic violence as an issue of gender take over the programme. There were also concerns that O'Connor had originally been invited to speak about CAFCASS and the Family Courts, yet the programme was changed to focus on domestic violence.

Later, a BBC committee, investigating on behalf of the BBC Governors, concluded that there were "some weaknesses" in the programme when considered against the BBC's journalistic values of "Truth and Accuracy, Serving the Public Interest, Impartiality and Diversity of Opinion, Independence and Accountability" but that the programme "still made a valuable contribution to the debate on parental rights". Overall the committee "did not think that these matters were sufficient to constitute a serious breach of editorial standards" and found that "the programme had provided appropriate and balanced information around the allegation that violent men had infiltrated F4J".

Charity work
Bruce is an honorary vice president of optical charity Vision Aid Overseas (VAO), alongside fellow newsreader Sir Trevor McDonald. In February 2005, Bruce did the voice-over for VAO's Lifeline Appeal. In 2007 Bruce launched VAO's Annual Review. Later that year she was one of nine prominent women to take part in the What's it going to take? campaign for the charity Women's Aid.

In 2009, the NSPCC inducted her into its Hall of Fame in honour of her continued work on their behalf. In accepting the honour, she said, "The work of the NSPCC and ChildLine is desperately important and I do little compared to what needs to be done. But I'm very honoured to be included in the Hall of Fame."

Personal life
Bruce met Nigel Sharrocks (born 1956) when he was director of the advertising agency where she worked. He is non-executive chairman of Digital Cinema Media. They married in July 1994 in Islington, London. The couple have two children, a son born in January 1998 and a daughter born in November 2001. Bruce encountered much adverse publicity for her decision to return to work with Crimewatch 16 days after the birth of her daughter. In 2014, Bruce stated that she does not use social media because of the misogynistic abuse directed towards female celebrities. She lives in Belsize Park, north-west London.

She was awarded the female Rear of the Year title in 2010, and accepted it in person. The following year, however, she declared that her acceptance of it had been "hypocritical" and that the award was "demeaning".

See also
 Antiques Roadshow Detectives

References

External links

 
 Vision Aid Overseas
 Profile from BBC News
 BBC Newswatch Profile
 Her BBC Press Office biography
 Profile from 'Real Story'

|-

|-

|-

1964 births
Living people
English people of Scottish descent
Alumni of Hertford College, Oxford
British television presenters
BBC newsreaders and journalists
British journalists
British women journalists
Clan Bruce
British reporters and correspondents
People from Singapore
British feminists
Question Time (TV programme)
People educated at the University of London Institute in Paris
National Society for the Prevention of Cruelty to Children people
People from Heswall
British women television journalists
British women radio presenters
Singaporean women radio presenters
British women television presenters
Fake or Fortune?